Guy Hersant (born 1949) is a French photographer.

Biography
Born in Loire Atlantique (France), Guy Hersant entered apprenticeship at the age of sixteen and obtained his CAP in photography while working as an assistant for several photographers. He later opened his own studio in Lorient in 1975. There he concentrated on portraits and reporting until 1990.

He went to Africa for the first time in 1971, where he was an assistant in a studio run by a Frenchman in Bamako). It was the beginning of a personal photography, the revelation of the taste for traveling and the passion for Africa.

He co-founded the collective of Brittany photographers "Sellit" in 1979. He created in 1982, and managed until 1989, the meetings of the photography in Brittany, then the gallery Le Lieu in Lorient. Afterward, Guy Hersant settled in Paris and photographed architecture. He travelled again in West Africa and made photographic series of the valleys of the river Niger.

He co-led the African Photography Encounters from 1994 until 2001. He has conducted research, wrote and published on the photography of studio and itinerant photographers in Africa, contributing to awareness of the works of these photographers.

In 1995, he began a series of photos of groups in the forest of Crécy (Somme, France) which began the spirit of the project Please do not move! that began in Kano (Nigeria) on the instigation of the Alliance française of this city in 2000. The project was to develop in the following years in France in Amiens, Le Touquet, Mulhouse; in Libreville (Gabon), Gao (Mali), and in January, 2010 in association with Jean-Michel Rousset and Eric Adjetey Anang in Teshie (Ghana). It is this work which confirmed the vision, at the same time documentary and human, which crossed the whole work of the photographer.

Expositions
 Nature humaine. Musée de l’Hospice Saint-Roch – Issoudun . October 2007 -  April 2008
 Portraits au Gabon. Festival « Les photographiques » - Le Mans . February 2008
 Les hommes sont des acteurs… Théâtre La Passerelle, Scène nationale – Gap . October  - December 2007
 Portraits de groupe. Château de Suze-la-Rousse – Drôme . September - December 2007
 J’ai trouvé l’eau si belle. Festival Photo Nature & Paysage – La Gacilly . June–September 2006
 (travail). La Filature, Scène nationale – Mulhouse . January–March 2006
 Please do not move!. Alliance française de Kano (Nigeria) – octobre 2005; Université Rennes2  . April-June2006
 Africa-urbis – exposition collective. Musée des Arts Derniers, Paris - May–September 2005
 Tout le monde. Musée du Touquet (Pas de Calais) - March–June 2005
 Kan be soni. (Avec G.Clariana, Th.Corroyer, O.Dumbia, M.Sanogo, S.M.Sidibé), École Supérieure d’Art et de design, Amiens, avril 2002; Institut national des arts Bamako (Mali), October 2001
 Les routes du fleuve. La Bibliothèque - Saint-Herblain, 1999; Université de Picardie, Amiens, September 2001
 Un itinéraire africain : 1971-2000. Aubenas - July 2001
 In Lagos. Galerie Auteurs, Paris 14e, March 2000; Alliance Française de Lagos (Nigeria) - November 2000  
 Harar. Musée Rimbaud, Charleville-Mézières - November 1999-February 2000
 Champs, agriculture dans l’Aisne. Maison des Arts Laon, June–September 1999
 La photographie à Grignan, Grignan, 1995
 L’Africaine. Rencontres Photographiques en Bretagne, Lorient, 1991; Carré Amelot, La Rochelle, 1993; l’Atelier, Paris, 1993
 Vigo VI. Commande Ville de Vigo, 2e Fotobienal, Vigo, (Spain) 1986
 Itinérance. Galerie nationale, Dakar (Senegal) 1984
 Vous avez dit rural ? (avec M. Massi, H. Bramberger, M. Garanger), B.P.I. du Centre Pompidou, Paris, 1983
 Voyages  à Ouessant. Musée des Arts décoratifs, Nantes, 1979
 Vu en Chine. (avec F. Huguier, F. Lochon, F. Saur), B.P.I. du Centre Pompidou, Paris, 1979

Editions
 Nature humaine. 40 colour photographies, text Pascal Mougin . Editions du Musée de l’Hospice Saint–Roch. Issoudun 2007
 Tout le monde. 45 colour photographies, comments by Laurence Perrigault, Editions Filigranes 2005
 Please do not move ! in Kano. 23 colour photographies, poems by Sam Cambio, Editions Filigranes, 2005.  
 Harar. 19 black & white photographies, text by Bernard Noël, Editions Filigranes, 1999.
 Champs. 65 colour and black & white photographies, text by Guy Marival, preface Bernard Noël, Editions Filigranes, 1999.
 L’Africaine. 13 black & white photographies, text by Ch. Jacob . Editions Filigranes 1993
 La Chine quotidienne. 70 black & white photographies, text by R. Trottignon, preface E. Manac’h, Editions Leoreca, 1979.

Films
 Guragu, DVD movie on street disabled people in Lagos (Nigeria). 18 minutes, July 2001
 Photographes guinéens, video, 8 minutes 30 seconds, Maison européenne de la photographie, 1994.

Public collections
 FRAC Bretagne, Rennes
 Galerie Le Lieu, Lorient
 Bibliothèque nationale de France, Paris
 Bibliothèque de Documentation Internationale Contemporaine, Paris
 Bibliothèque Historique de la Ville de Paris, Paris
 Le Ring – artothèque, Nantes
 Musée de Bretagne, Rennes

Published texts and conversations
 Le Photographe doit être gai Malick Sidibé, Editions Filigranes and Afriphoto, 2005.
 AFRICA URBIS O.Sultan, catalogue, Editions Sepia - 2005
 Studio Malick, Catalogue Les Afriques, Editions Autrement, Paris, 2004.
 Preface for Photographes ambulants, Editions Filigranes et Afriphoto, 2004.
 Preface for Gabriel Fasunon, Editions Filigranes and Afriphoto, 2004.
 A vignette from Lomé : the street photographers’blues, Visual Anthropology, Photographies and modernities in Africa volume XIV, number 3, Harwood publishers academic, 2001
 Interview of Emma Sudour, for "Voir" les photographies, n°9, February 2001
 Lomé, le blues des photographes ambulants, Africultures, July 2001
 Au temps de Sékou Touré; Portraits peints d’Addis Ababa, in Anthologie de la photographie africaine, Editions Revue Noire, Paris, 1998, Prix Nadar 1999.
 Anthologie de la photographie africaine, Editions Revue Noire, 1998
 Entretien avec Brigitte Ollier, Libération, 17 October 1997
 36 ans de photographies en Guinée, Le Photographe, December 1994 – January 1995
 Images de Conakry, Jeune Afrique, September 1994

Workshops
 Workshop with the students of Collège Alan Seeger, Vailly-sur-Aisne 2007 /2008
 Workshop in Ecole des Beaux-Arts «Le Quai », Mulhouse – December 2005
 Intervention on architecture and urban landscapes photography at Ecole des Beaux-arts de Paris – February 2004 – October 2004
 Artistice residence in Le Touquet : one week workshop with adolescents – February 2004
 Les photographes ambulants au Togo, Bénin, Ghana et Nigeria, supported by Afrique en Créations / AFAA, 20 September to 16 November 1999
 Autour de la Bibliothèque de France, with students in second year at Ecole Nationale Supérieure des Arts Décoratifs de Paris, 1993-1994.
 Photographies négociées at Club Méditerranée of Cefalu (Sicilia), 1985.

Curator of exhibitions
2004
 Malick Sidibé and other photographers from Mali : Vive la COPHOTEX, la Filature, Ecole des Beaux-arts, Le Quai and Musée d’Impression sur Etoffe in Mulhouse.

2001
 Les photographes ambulants au Ghana, Nigeria, Togo et Benin.
 Gabriel Fasunon photographe de studio au Nigeria.
 Artistic direction and co-ordination of KAN BE SONI with photographers from Mali and France. Amiens.

1998
 Boxing Ghana. photographies from the archives of Ghanaian Ministry of Information on boxing, a mythic sport in Ghana during the 60s and 70s, and on the boxing studios in Accra by Francis Provençal, a young Ghanaian photographer.

1996
 Photographes ambulants in Addis Ababa ( Ethiopia).
 Portraits de studio coloriés in Addis Ababa.
 Les photographes de presse à Nairobi (Kenya).

1994
 Syli Photo:  Sékou Touré photo service in the first years of Guinea independence.

References

External links
 Official website
 Purpose - webmag photographique
 Africultures, cultures africaines
 
 

1949 births
Living people
French photographers
Portrait photographers